A Section 8 notice, also known as the Section 8 notice to quit or Form 3. It is a prerequisite if the landlord of an assured tenancy or assured shorthold tenancy wishes to obtain possession order from the court, thereby ending the tenancy, for a reason based on a circumstance entitling the landlord to possession under the grounds pleaded. It is used in England and Wales and is part of the Housing Act 1988. as amended by the Housing Act 1996.

Overview 

An assured shorthold tenancy may also be ended by the execution of a possession order based on a Section 21 notice. The differences between the Section 8 and Section 21 procedures are:

 A Section 21 notice may be used without the landlord giving any reason, whereas for a Section 8 notice to be used the landlord must satisfy one of the statutory grounds for eviction. 
 The Section 8 notice may be used for an assured shorthold tenancy or an assured tenancy. Section 21 Notice cannot be used for an Assured tenancy.

The Section 8 notice lists 17 grounds. The landlord can seek to regain possession of the property before or after the fixed term of the tenancy comes to an end based only on these grounds. When the landlord serves the tenant with the Section 8 notice, they have to state the grounds by which they are seeking possession of the property, using the precise wording specified in Schedule 2 of 1988 Housing Act and the reasons for relying on these grounds. The notice must be in the prescribed form for a section 8 notice.

How the Section 8 notice is served
Once the Section 8 notice has been filled out, it must be sent to all of the tenants living at the address.

It is usually customary to allow a minimum of three working days for the Section 8 notice to arrive at the address of the tenant. The Section 8 notice expires two weeks or two months after this date, depending on which of the 17 grounds have been cited. It is only once the Section 8 notice has expired, and the issue has not been resolved, that the landlord can apply for a possession order from Her Majesty's Courts and Tribunals Service (HMCTS).

The possession order

Once the Section 8 notice has been served, the landlord can apply to the court for a hearing to get a possession order using the forms N119 and N5 and by paying the court fees.

The landlord is then given a date to attend court, the first hearing, and must attend on this date. If the tenant has not filed a defence or does not attend court to challenge the claim, the court may make a possession order at the first hearing.  If the tenant does defend the claim, the court will issue directions at the first hearing and adjourn the claim until a further hearing when the case will be heard in full. If the possession order is granted then it takes effect fourteen days after it has been issued, although in some cases this may be extended to six weeks where it is deemed that the tenant will face serious hardship as a result of the repossession.

Grounds for possession

When the Section 8 notice is served, the landlord must base the decision to apply for a possession order on one or more of 17 grounds. The court will then decide upon whether to grant a possession order based on these grounds.

The amount of notice that must be given to the tenant differs depending on the grounds. For grounds 1, 2, 5, 6, 7, 9 and 16, two months’ notice or more must be given. For grounds 3, 4, 8, 10, 11, 12, 13, 15 and 17, two weeks’ notice is required. In the case of ground 14A, proceedings can be started immediately after serving the notice. During the Covid 19 pandemic in 2020 most of the periods of notice were extended significantly in order to reduce the number of people potentially being made homeless in a period of crisis. With exceptions for significant rent owed and anti-social behaviour, most periods of notice were set to be six months.

Grounds 1 to 8 are mandatory, meaning if the landlord can prove to the court that they apply then the court must grant the possession order. The other grounds are all discretionary.

Mandatory grounds

Ground 1: landlord taking property as their own home 
Used when the landlord wants to live in the property as a permanent home. It is only permitted when the landlord has already lived in it as their main home or they, or their spouse require it to live in as his or her main home.

Evidence of this may be required, together with evidence that the landlord intends to leave their current home.

Ground 1 cannot be served during the fixed term period.

Ground 2: mortgage repossession 
Used when the property is subject to a mortgage that existed before the start of the tenancy, and the lender wants to repossess the property.

Ground 3: holiday let 
Used when the tenancy is for a period of a maximum of eight months and the property was occupied as a holiday let within the period of twelve months prior to the start of the tenancy. Written notice must be given before or at the start of the tenancy that possession might be recovered based on this ground.

Ground 3 cannot be served during the fixed term period.

Ground 4: property tied to an educational institution 
Used when the tenancy is for a period of no more than twelve months and the property belongs to an educational institution. Written notice must be given before or at the start of the tenancy that possession might be recovered based on this ground.

Ground 4 cannot be served during the fixed term period.

Ground 5: housing for a minister of religion 
Used when the property is being used by a minister of religion and is required for another minister. Written notice must be given before or at the start of the tenancy that possession might be recovered based on this ground.

Ground 5 cannot be served during the fixed term period.

Ground 6: refurbishment 
Used when the landlord wants to reconstruct, demolish or carry out works on part or all of the property which cannot go ahead with the tenant there, perhaps because the tenant will not allow access. If this ground is used, the landlord has to pay reasonable removal costs.

Ground 6 cannot be served during the fixed term period.

Ground 7: death of the tenant 
Used when the previous tenant has deceased and the tenancy has passed to a new tenant but the new tenant does not have the right to carry on with the tenancy. Proceedings must be brought within twelve months following the death of the tenant, or within twelve months of the landlord becoming aware of the death of the tenant.

Ground 7A: conviction for serious offence

Ground 7B: service on landlord of notice by Secretary of State in respect of illegal immigrants

Ground 8: rent arrears 
Used when the rent is still in arrears on the date that the Section 8 notice is served and on the date of the hearing. Where rent is due weekly or fortnightly, at least eight weeks' rent must be in arrears. Where rent is due monthly, at least two months’ rent must be in arrears. Where rent is due quarterly, at least a quarter's rent must be in arrears by more than three months. Where rent is due yearly, at least three months' rent must be in arrears by more than three months.

Discretionary grounds

Ground 9: alternative accommodation 
This ground states that alternative accommodation will be available for the tenant in the case that the possession order is made and that the landlord has to pay reasonable removal expenses.

Ground 9 cannot be served during the fixed term period.

Ground 10: rent arrears 
Used when any amount of rent is due on the date that the Section 8 notice is served and is still due on the date that proceedings begin.

Ground 11: regular failure to pay rent 
Used when the tenant has failed on a regular basis to pay the rent. Rent does not have to be in arrears on the date that the Section 8 notice is served.

Ground 12: breach of tenancy agreement 
Used when there has been a breach of any term of the tenancy agreement.

Ground 13: neglect of property 
Used when the property has been neglected by the tenant, sub-tenant or someone living in the property with the tenant who the tenant has not removed and as a result the condition of the property has deteriorated.

Ground 14: anti-social behaviour 
Used when the tenant has caused problems with neighbours, visitors or anyone else; has used the property for illegal or immoral purposes and received a conviction for this; or has received a conviction for an indictable offence in or near the property.

Ground 14a: domestic violence 
Used when the property is occupied by a couple and one member of the couple has left due to violence or threats from the other partner towards the partner who has left or a member of their family who was residing in the property. This ground only applies to property which is owned by a charitable housing trust or registered social landlord.

Ground 15: poor treatment of furnishings 
Used when the furniture in the property has been treated badly by the tenant or by someone residing in the property who the tenant has not removed.

Ground 16: tied to employment 
Used when the tenant was employed by the landlord of the property and has now left the landlord's employment.

Ground 16 cannot be served during the fixed term period.

Ground 17: false statements 
The tenant is the person, or one of the persons, to whom the tenancy was granted and the landlord was induced to grant the tenancy by a false statement made knowingly or recklessly by—
(a) the tenant, or
(b) a person acting at the tenant's instigation

References

External links 
Housing Act 1988
HM Courts and Tribunals Service
DirectGov: Private Renting

Landlord–tenant law